Hamari Traoré (born 27 January 1992) is a Malian professional footballer who plays as a right-back for Ligue 1 club Rennes, of which he is the captain, and the Mali national team.

Club career
Traore joined Lierse in 2013 from Paris FC. He made his Belgian Pro League debut on 30 October 2013 against Sporting Lokeren. He played the full game, which ended in a 1–0 away defeat.

International career
Traore was called up to the Mali national team and made his debut in a 4–1 friendly win against Burkina Faso.

Career statistics

Club

International

Scores and results list Mali's goal tally first, score column indicates score after each Traoré goal.

Honours
Rennes
Coupe de France: 2018–19

References

External links
 

1992 births
Living people
Sportspeople from Bamako
Malian footballers
Association football fullbacks
Mali international footballers
2017 Africa Cup of Nations players
2019 Africa Cup of Nations players
2021 Africa Cup of Nations players
Paris FC players
Lierse S.K. players
Stade de Reims players
Stade Rennais F.C. players
Belgian Pro League players
Ligue 1 players
Ligue 2 players
Championnat National players
Malian expatriate footballers
Malian expatriate sportspeople in France
Expatriate footballers in France
Malian expatriate sportspeople in Belgium
Expatriate footballers in Belgium
21st-century Malian people